Maha Thray Sithu Win was a Burmese diplomat, politician and lawyer.

Life
From 1930 to 1942 he was Senior Master at the Education Department.
From 1942 to 1944, during Japanese occupation, he was Deputy Director in charge of Labour.
From 1945 to 1947 he was President, Trade Union Congress (Burma).
In 1947 he was:
Leader of the Burma Socialist Party and Member in the Constituent Assembly from the Lanmadaw Township Rangoon.
Vice-President of the Anti-Fascist People's Freedom League.
Member of Governor's Executive Council in charge of Industry and Labour, 
High Commissioner for Burma in India.
From 1948 to 1950 he was Ambassador in New Delhi.
On September 28, 1948 he was designated Minister for Education and Democratisation of Local Administration.
On January 3, 1950 he was designated Minister for DLA (Democratisation of Local Administration), Public Health, Rehabilitation and Public Works.
From September 14, 1950 to 1952 he was Minister for Defence, Home and Religious Affairs.
On August 30, 1951 he was elected to the Chamber of Deputies from Yamethin South.
On March 16, 1952 he was designated Minister for National Planning and Religious Affairs.
On September 5, 1953 he was designated Minister for Union Culture.
From December 5, 1955 to August 21, 1959 he was ambassador in Washington, D.C. and concurrently till 1957 Permanent Representative next the Headquarters of the United Nations.
Within the Headquarters of the United Nations he was chairman of the Asian-African Group.
In August 1958 he was designated and on  co-accredited as Myanmar Ambassador to Canada.
In 1959 he became Member of the Executive Committee of the Clean AFPFL.
In March 1960 he became Treasurer of the Union Party (Burma).
On March 17, 1961 he resigned with entire Executive Committee of the Clean AFPFL.

References

1905 births
20th-century deaths
Ambassadors of Myanmar to India
Ambassadors of Myanmar to the United States
Ambassadors of Myanmar to Canada
Permanent Representatives of Myanmar to the United Nations